Fear Chamber (La camara del terror/ The Room of Terror), also released as The Torture Zone, is a 1968 Mexican horror film directed by Juan Ibáñez and starring Boris Karloff and Julissa. It was filmed in May 1968, but was only released theatrically in 1971, 2 years after Karloff had died.

Fear Chamber is one of four low-budget Mexican horror films Karloff made in a package deal with Mexican producer Luis Enrique Vergara. The others are Isle of the Snake People, The Incredible Invasion, and House of Evil. Karloff's scenes for all four films were directed by Jack Hill in Los Angeles in the spring of 1968. The films were then completed in Mexico.

Premise
Scientists discover a living rock beneath a volcano. It feeds on the adrenaline of frightened young women, so the scientists construct a fear chamber and kidnap young girls to feed the creature.

Cast
Boris Karloff as Dr. Carl Mandel
Julissa as Corinne Mandel
Carlos East as Mark
Isela Vega as Helga
Yerye Beirute as Roland
Santanón – Midget

References

External links

1968 films
1968 horror films
Mexican horror films
1960s science fiction horror films
English-language Mexican films
Films directed by Jack Hill
1960s English-language films
1960s Mexican films